A total lunar eclipse will take place on June 17, 2076. The moon will pass through the center of the Earth's shadow. While the visual effect of a total eclipse is variable, the Moon may be stained a deep orange or red color at maximum eclipse. With a gamma value of only -0.0452 and an umbral eclipse magnitude of 1.7943, this is the second greatest eclipse in Saros series 131 as well as the largest and darkest lunar eclipse between June 26, 2029 and June 28, 2094. Overall, it will be the third largest and darkest lunar eclipse of the 21st century. While it will have similar values to the lunar eclipse of July 16, 2000, totality will not last over 106 minutes due to the moon's relatively large apparent size as seen from Earth and greater speed in its elliptical orbit. Totality's expected to last 100 minutes 34 seconds from 9:11:39 to 10:52:15 with the greatest point at 10:01:57 UTC.

Visibility

Related lunar eclipses

Saros series

Half-Saros cycle
A lunar eclipse will be preceded and followed by solar eclipses by 9 years and 5.5 days (a half saros). This lunar eclipse is related to two annular solar eclipses of Solar Saros 138.

See also 
List of lunar eclipses and List of 21st-century lunar eclipses

Notes

External links 
 

2076-06
2076-06
2076 in science
Central total lunar eclipses